Heston is both an Irish and English surname and a given name. Notable people with the name include:

Surname
 Alan Heston (born 1934), American economist
 Charlton Heston (1923–2008), American actor
 Chris Heston (born 1988), American baseball player
 Edward W. Heston (1745–1824), American revolutionary
 Fraser Clarke Heston (born 1955), American screenwriter, son of Charlton Heston
 Steven L. Heston, American mathematician, economist and financier
 Watson Heston (1846–1905), American cartoonist
 Willie Heston (1878–1963), American footballer

Given name
 Heston Blumenthal (born 1966), English chef
 Heston Kjerstad (born 1999), American baseball player

Fictional characters
Heston Carter, on the soap opera Doctors

English-language surnames
English given names
Given names originating from a surname